In the Court of the Dragon is the tenth studio album by American heavy metal band Trivium. It was released on October 8, 2021, through Roadrunner Records and was produced by Josh Wilbur.

Background and promotion
In June 2020, guitarist Corey Beaulieu revealed the band is already working on the follow-up to What the Dead Men Say while being in COVID-19 pandemic quarantine, saying the material they've been working on sounds "really pissed-off."

On July 7, 2021, the band teased that they are planning to release new music on Friday, July 9, with a 2-minute video trailer hinting at some potentially new music. On that day, the band officially released the new single and title track "In the Court of the Dragon" along with its music video. On August 10, the band started posting more cryptic images and videos pertaining to another new single on their social media pages. The second single, "Feast of Fire", was released on August 12 along with a corresponding music video. At the same time, the band announced the album itself, the album cover, the track list, and release date.

On August 19, a collaboration between Trivium and Bethesda Game Studios has been announced that will include The Elder Scrolls Online-themed music video. On October 1, one week before the album release, the band unveiled the third single "The Phalanx" along with an accompanying music video. The single is the album's final track and a re-recording of a scrapped song from the Shogun sessions. A music video for "The Shadow of the Abattoir" was released on November 17, 2022.

Composition

Style and themes
The genre of the album has been described primarily as thrash metal, progressive metal, metalcore, and heavy metal. The album's artwork is a painting by Mathieu Nozieres. Regarding the artwork, Heafy relayed, "While the music of In the Court of the Dragon was taking shape, we knew we needed epic artwork of the type that you might see on the wall of an important museum from a long-dead renaissance master."

Lyrical content of the album is based on mythology inspired by fantasy literature. Instead of focusing on existing mythologies, the band decided to explore and create its own mythology within Trivium.

Reception

Critical reception

The album received critical acclaim from critics. AllMusic gave the album a positive review saying, "As a whole, In the Court of the Dragon stands with Trivium's best work. It offers a classic meld of melodic thrash/metalcore and tech death in a sound as enormous as it is ambitious and diverse, making for wonderfully produced, flawlessly composed songs. All killer, no filler." Dom Lawson from Blabbermouth.net gave the album 8.5 out of 10 and said: "Having stayed the course, TRIVIUM are justifiably brimming with confidence on In the Court of the Dragon. The speed with which this record was put together, irrespective of circumstance, points to a laudable, collective drive to keep creating." Dan McHugh of Distorted Sound scored the album 10 out of 10 and said: "At this stage in their career TRIVIUM have nothing left to prove and have sat proudly amongst the elite for multiple decades, yet they still come out firing on all cylinders and have crafted material that offers something new and refreshing. In the Court of the Dragon is as bold and creative as it is fearlessly experimental. They have managed to push their boundaries without neglecting the core elements which have made them one of the most revered bands on the planet and in turn, have created one of the strongest albums, if not the pinnacle of their career to date." Kerrang! gave the album 4 out of 5 and stated: "Taken together, this makes for one of 2021's most compelling pure metal releases, and gives its makers reason to feel proud of their craft. Ably demonstrating that they have only grown stronger over the course of their 22-year career, it really would not be a surprise if they finally make the transition into arena-headlining status with In the Court of the Dragon. These are songs that are built to be played from the largest stages, and deserve to be."

Louder Sound gave the album a positive review and stated: "In terms of a band playing contemporary, modern heavy metal, Trivium have been the best for some time. They still are, and In the Court of the Dragon is a fucking awesome heavy metal album. Was it ever in doubt?" Metal Injection rated the album 9 out of 10 and stated, "In the Court of the Dragon presents a sound blown open so wide that it's almost impossible to guess at what might come next. Though with an album like this to listen to, who cares when that'll be?" New Noise gave the album 4 out of 5 and stated: "Fans of the band will be ecstatic with what they're hearing. This is a powerful and anthemic album, with each track building from the last. Trivium really brought it here, and to be honest, this might be my number one Metal album of the year." Rock 'N' Load praised the album saying, "In the Court of the Dragon is a gripping and totally engaging album that has everything that you could ever wish for not solely from a Trivium album, but a metal album and needs to be heard by any fan of the genre. Trust me, you just have to." Jamie Giberti of Rock Sins rated the album 8.5 out of 10 and said: "In the Court of the Dragon is the third act in the trilogy of The Sin and the Sentence and What the Dead Men Say. An excellent continual evolution, rather than revolution, and one that should see Trivium continue to ascend to the heights of the last few years and beyond." Wall of Sound gave the album a perfect score 10/10 and saying: "Trivium is now just Trivium, and In the Court of the Dragon is another release that defines what that means– they are one of the best metal bands on the planet." Loudwire called it one of the best metal albums of 2021.

Accolades

Track listing

Personnel
Credits adapted from AllMusic and the album's liner notes.

Trivium
 Matt Heafy – lead vocals, guitars
 Corey Beaulieu – guitars, backing vocals
 Paolo Gregoletto – bass, backing vocals
 Alex Bent – drums, percussion

Additional personnel
 Josh Wilbur – production, engineering, mixing
 Ihsahn – programming, arranging, instrumentation, orchestration, composition (track 1)
 Paul Suarez – mixing assistance
 Ted Jensen – mastering
 Ashley Heafy – art direction, design, layout
 Trivium – art direction
 Mathieu Nozieres – artwork
 Ryan Mackfall and Tom Griffiths – photography
 Mike Dunn – band photo

Charts

References

2021 albums
Trivium (band) albums
Roadrunner Records albums